Winter Jones, previously Tony Yalda, sometimes credited as Anthony Yalda (born March 25, 1981) is a non-binary Assyrian actor.

Biography
Jones was born to Assyrian parents in Beirut, Lebanon. Their family fled Lebanon after facing persecution during the Lebanese Civil War. Like most Assyrian refugees, their family arrived in Athens, Greece, seeking asylum.  Four years later, the family finally arrived in Chicago, Illinois.

Jones studied theatre at DePaul University and Roosevelt University's Theatre Conservatory.  In 2004,  they dropped out of school and arrived in Los Angeles to pursue a career in acting. Pretending to be a messenger service, dropping off pictures and resumes, they  made the rounds of casting offices until in 2005  they landed a role in The Comeback starring Lisa Kudrow. They  booked their next role in American Dreamz a month later, which landed him with former talent agency, GVA Talent.

Their  former band The Hollabacks won a national competition for 7 Eleven in 2010, making the band the face of Slurpee for a 6-month campaign.
The Hollabacks music was featured in Cyrus. The band was also archived in Wolfgang’s Vault.

Jones moved to Minneapolis in 2011 to pursue  their  solo career with producer/songwriter Michael Bland who is the former drummer for the late Prince. Jones wrote two albums with Bland, O My God and Sex Appeal under the alias Ladyboi. The two albums are now featured as Winter Jones, Volume I on Spotify.

Jones dropped the name Ladyboi in 2014 adopting the name Winter Jones, and legally changing their name in 2015.
Jones currently resides in Chicago, IL and is writing/recording and performing in the Windy City.

Career

Film
Fairies (2003) as MAX
My Porn Star (2004) as Anthony
A Moment of Grace (2004) as Nidhal
Mush (2005) as Mush
American Dreamz (2006) as Iqbal Riza
Americanizing Shelley (2007) as Happy Singh
Meet the Spartans (2008) as Sanjaya Malakar
House Broken (2009) as Gilroy
The Last Stop (2009) as Wedding Planner
The Taqwacores (2010) as Muzzamil
Cyrus (2010/11) as Tom

TV
The Comeback as Raoul (2005) in the episode "Valerie Relaxes in Palm Springs"
Girlfriends (2006) as Lem in two episodes: "Party Over Here" and "The It Girl"
Help Me Help You (2006) as Nadeem in the episode "The Sheriff"
The Middleman (2008) as Underworld Desk Clerk in the episode "The Accidental Occidental Conception"
Roommates (2009) as Winston in the episode "The Uninvited Thorn", "The Break-In", "The Lie" and "The Roommate"

Video
 Para matar a un asesino aka To Kill a Killer (2004) as Security Guard

Soundtracks
 American Dreamz (2006) - performer: "Super Freak"
Meet the Spartans (2008) - performer: "I Will Survive"

See also
List of Assyrians

References

External links

1981 births
Assyrian actors
Lebanese emigrants to the United States
Living people
DePaul University alumni
Roosevelt University alumni
Non-binary actors
Non-binary musicians